Nathalie Claire Cox (born September 1978, Leicestershire, England) is a British actress and model publicly known as Natalie Cox. She is best known for her role as Juno Eclipse in the video game Star Wars: The Force Unleashed and its sequel, as well as her role in Ridley Scott's Kingdom of Heaven, and later her role as the Player character's agent, Emma Jenkins, in the Codemasters F1 games starting in F1 2016 to present.

Nomination
Cox was nominated for the 2008 National Academy of Video Game Trade Reviewers (NAVGTR) Award for best supporting performance in a drama for Star Wars: The Force Unleashed.

Filmography

Film

Television

Videogames

References

External links

Living people
English female models
English film actresses
Actresses from London
1978 births